Miljonlotteriet is a Swedish lottery company owned by IOGT-NTO, and incorporated in 1964. It all started with a dream and a desire to make a
difference. Stig Kroon, a passionate entrepreneur, in 1964, built the
foundation of what today is Miljonlotteriet.

Miljonlotteriet is a Swedish state licensed lottery operator, fully
owned by and incorporated in the charity organization, IOGT-NTO. The whole
surplus thus goes to IOGT-NTO. During the past 15 years,
Miljonlotteriet has contributed a surplus of more than SEK 1.6 billion to the
non – profitable work of IOGT-NTO.

Miljonlotteriet is one of the leading lotteries on the Scandinavian
market with more than 50 years’ of profitable experience. The sales have more
than doubled the past ten years.

Miljonlotteriet was the first lottery operator to
offer subscription of scratch tickets to customers. Years later,
Miljonlotteriet, continues to offer offline scratch tickets both as
subscription and also as scratch tickets supplied by retailers. To meet the changes in the market and customer needs the product portfolio has grown
and now includes online games such as scratch tickets and bingo.

The scratch ticket Miljonlotteriet, is the second most sold scratch
ticket in Sweden.

The lottery is supervised by the Swedish Gaming Board.

Miljonlotteriet is situated in Mölnlycke, Sweden and has 60 employees.

External links

 

Lotteries